Diego Gerard Vergara Bernales (born 4 August 2002) is a Chilean footballer who plays as a midfielder for Provincial Ovalle in the Chilean Tercera A.

Career
Despite of he was on the professional squad of Coquimbo Unido since 2019 season, he made his professional debut against Universidad Católica on 5 September 2020.

Career statistics

Club

Notes

Honours
Coquimbo Unido
 Primera B (1): 2021

References

External links
 
 Diego Vergara at playmakerstats.com (English version of ceroacero.es)

2002 births
Living people
People from Valparaíso Province
Chilean footballers
Association football midfielders
Coquimbo Unido footballers
Chilean Primera División players
Primera B de Chile players